The 2010 season is Muangthong United's 4th season in the Thai Premier League of Muangthong United Football Club.

Pre-season and friendlies

Kor Royal Cup

Thai Premier League

League table

Thai FA Cup

Thai League Cup

AFC Champions League

AFC Cup 

Group G Table

{|
|-
|

Knockout phase

Squad statistics

Transfers

In

Out

Loan in

Loan out

Muangthong United
2010